Isidoro Ngei Ko Lat (17 September 1918 – 24 May 1950) was a catechist from Myanmar who was killed in 1950. He was beatified in 2014.

Biography
Isidoro Ngei Ko Lat was the son of peasants and the priest Dominic Pedrotti baptized him on 7 September 1918. His parents died when he was young and both he and his younger brother were cared for by their aunt and uncle. By 1925, he began attending primary school in his village.

As he grew older, he expressed a desire to serve God and his vocation led him to the minor seminary of Saint Teresa where he studied for six years until World War II started. During the war, he returned to his village and became a teacher where he opened a school for the village children.

In 1946, Mario Vergara arrived for his mission in Myanmar, and he met Ko Lat. He ultimately decided that Ko Lat would join him in his missionary work. After the 1948 independence of Myanmar, he and Vergara were threatened by the guerillas in Myanmar and the two were murdered.

Beatification
The Congregation for the Causes of Saints approved the cause of beatification which commenced on 23 October 2001. This bestowed upon him the title of Servant of God. Pope Francis approved his and Mario Vergara's martyrdom on 9 December 2013, thus, allowing for their beatification. Cardinal Angelo Amato represented the pope at the beatification on 24 May 2014.

References

External links
Hagiography Circle
Saints SQPN

1918 births
1950 deaths
Beatifications by Pope Francis
20th-century venerated Christians
20th-century Roman Catholic martyrs
People from Kayin State
Burmese Roman Catholics